In mathematics, in the field of topology, a topological space is said to be pseudonormal if given two disjoint closed sets in it, one of which is countable, there are disjoint open sets containing them. Note the following:
 Every normal space is pseudonormal.
 Every pseudonormal space is regular.

References

Topology
Properties of topological spaces